Playfair is an English surname which came to England after the Norman Conquest. The name derives from the Old French toponymic surname Plouvier and came from Plouvien, Brittany. Notable people with the surname include:

 Andrew W. Playfair (1790–1868), Canadian politician, son of William
Dylan Playfair (born 1992), Canadian actor
 Sir Edward Playfair (1909–1999), British civil servant and businessman
 Guy Lyon Playfair (1935 – 2018) British writer, son of I.S.O. Playfair 
 Henry Playfair (born 1983), Australian rules footballer
 Hugh Lyon Playfair (1787–1861), Provost of St Andrews
 Ian Stanley Ord Playfair (1894–1972), a general in the British Army and contributing author to British official history of the Second World War 
 James Playfair (architect) (1755–1794), Scottish architect, brother of John, Robert and William, father of William Henry
 Jim Playfair (born 1964), Canadian ice hockey player and coach, brother of Larry 
 John Playfair (1748–1819), Scottish scientist, mathematician, and professor of natural philosophy;  brother of James, Robert and William
 Judy Playfair (born 1953), Australian swimmer
 Sir Lambert Playfair (1828–1899), British soldier and author
 Larry Playfair (born 1958), Canadian ice hockey player and announcer, brother of Jim
 Lyon Playfair, 1st Baron Playfair (1818–1898), promoter of the Playfair cipher, manual symmetric encryption technique
 Sir Nigel Playfair (1874–1934), British actor and theater manager
 Patrick Playfair (1889–1974), British senior officer in Flying Corps and later RAF
 Robert Playfair (died 1825), solicitor before the Supreme Courts of Scotland, brother of John, James and William.
 Wendy Playfair, Australian actress
 William Playfair (1759–1823), Scottish engineer and political economist, inventor of statistical graphics, brother of James, Robert and John
 William Henry Playfair (1790–1857), Scottish architect (National Gallery of Scotland, Royal Scottish Academy), son of James
John Playfair Price (1905–1988), British diplomat